Suluk may refer to:

Something of, from, or related to Sulu
Suluk language, or Tausug language, an Austronesian language spoken by the Suluk people
Suluk people, or Tausūg people, an ethnic group of the Philippines, Malaysia and Indonesia

Places
Suluk, Syria, a town in Raqqa Governorate, Syria
Solok, a city in West Sumatra, Indonesia
Suluq, a town in Benghazi District, Libya

People
Suluk (Türgesh khagan) (died 738), Turkic tribe leader
Suluk Mehmed Reis, or Mahomet Sirocco (1525–1571), Ottoman Bey of Alexandria
Thomas Suluk (born 1950), Canadian politician
Donald Suluk (born c. 1925), Inuit religious figure

Other uses
Suluk Subdistrict, a subdistrict in Raqqa Governorate, Syria
Houtat Sulūk, a canyon in Raqqa Governorate, Syria
Trechus suluk, a species of ground beetle